Papilin is a protein that in humans is encoded by the PAPLN gene. Papilin is an extracellular matrix glycoprotein.

References

Further reading